Nicholas Scarvelis (born February 2, 1993, in Santa Barbara, California) is an American-born Greek  former athlete.  He represented Greece at the 2016 Olympics throwing the shot put.  Previously he represented the United States at the 2012 World Junior Championships. His sister is Stamatia Skarvelis

Prep
Prior to his Olympic experience, he went to Dos Pueblos High School in Goleta, California.  He was the 2011 CIF California State Meet Champion in the shot put throwing a school record .

NCAA
Next Nicholas Scarvelis threw for UCLA. He was the Pac-12 champion in the shot put three times and the discus once. He finished fourth at the 2016 NCAA Championships. Ahead of him on that list are John Godina, John Brenner and Dave Laut, all medalists at the Olympics or World Championships. His sister Stamatia is also a thrower for Tennessee Volunteers and previously competed for UCLA Bruins. His sister, Stamatia Scarvelis is the 2013 Pan American Junior Shot Put Champion, competing for USA. She has since also switched to compete for Greece.

Professional
In early 2020, Scarvelis broke Michalis Stamatogiannis's previous Greek National Indoor Record of 20.36 Greek National Indoor Record, throwing 20.38m in a meet in Iowa City, Iowa.

Scarvelis placed second represented Greece at the 2017 national championship throwing the shot put .

Scarvelis represented Greece at the 2016 Olympics throwing the shot put  to place 27th.

Previously he represented the United States at the 2012 World Junior Championships. Nicholas threw  at 2012 World Junior Championships in Athletics – Men's shot put to place 19th.

International competitions

References

Further reading

External links 

 
 
 

Living people
1993 births
American male shot putters
Greek male shot putters
Athletes (track and field) at the 2016 Summer Olympics
UCLA Bruins men's track and field athletes
Sportspeople from Santa Barbara, California
Olympic athletes of Greece